This list contains  video game titles released for Classic Mac OS (1 through 9.2.2) and macOS 10 or higher).

0–9

A

B

C

D

E

F

G

H

I

J

K

L

M

N

O

P

Q

R

S

T

U

V

W

X

Y

Z

See also
 Mac gaming
 Lists of video games
 List of Macintosh software

References

External links
 MacUpdate's games section
 Inside Mac Games: Reviews (affiliated with macgamestore: same owner)
 Steam's Mac games section
 Mac Games on Daily1Game (bigfishgames affiliate, same content as on bigfish)
 MMORPG for Mac
 Free Mac Games
 Macgames.org
 Mac Gamer HQ's Top 75 Mac Games

Classic Mac OS games
MacOS games
Macintosh